Chinchiná (estimated population 84,000) is a municipality located in the department of Caldas in Colombia,  southwest of Manizales. Chinchiná is rich in character and beautiful landscapes. Founded in 1857 by Antioquian colonists, Chinchiná is settled in a valley surrounded by coffee plantations, called "fincas", in the Central Cordillera of the Andes. Known as Colombia's coffee heart, the town is home to the Buendía coffee factory and Cenicafé, a coffee research center.

Because of its close association with coffee production, the municipality was named part of the "Coffee Cultural Landscape" UNESCO World Heritage Site in 2011.  

Its elevation is 1,360 meters (4,462 feet), and has a mean temperature of approximately 20 degrees Celsius.

References

External links

Municipalities of Caldas Department
1857 establishments in the Republic of New Granada